Vorderhornbach is a municipality in the district of Reutte in the Austrian state of Tyrol.

Geography
Vorderhornbach lies in the Lech valley at the entrance to the Hornbach valley.

References

Cities and towns in Reutte District